Generation on the Wind is a 1979 documentary film produced by David Vassar and Andrew Finley. The film is a character study centered on a rag tag group of young artists, mechanics and environmental activists who successfully built the largest electrical generating windmill in the world. The documentary required one year of shooting to finish the film. Generation on the Wind aired on PBS. It was then released to educational markets by Churchill Films.

Reception
David Ansen of Newsweek called Generation on the Wind "dull". Generation on the Wind was nominated for an Academy Award for Best Documentary Feature.

References

External links

1979 films
1979 documentary films
American documentary films
Documentary films about alternative energy
Wind power
Works about windmills
1970s English-language films
1970s American films